The Salvaging of Civilization: The Probable Future of Mankind is a non-fiction book by H. G. Wells which addresses the possibility of a future world state. It was published by The Macmillan Company of New York, for the first time in 1921.

Wells drew on the experience of the Great War to propose a socialist world state brought about through education and the manipulation of popular opinion. He outlines a new codification of morality and a readjustment of education based on the interests of the state, rather than the individual.

Chapters 
The table of contents is as follows:

 The Probable Future of Mankind  
 The Project of a World State 
 The Enlargement of Patriotism to a World State
 The Bible of Civilization part I
 The Bible of Civilization part II
 The Schooling of the World 
 College, Newspaper and Book
 The Envoy 
 Bibliography

References

External links 
. Full text available
 A scan of The Salvaging of Civilization at the Internet Archive Full text available
 The Salvaging of Civilisation on Goodreads
 

1921 non-fiction books
Books by H. G. Wells
British non-fiction books
Books in political philosophy
World government